</ref> Stone also choreographed and shot a video of the performance. According to Digital Spy, the video "almost out-Glees Glee" Steve and Rachel sang the lead vocals.

UNICEF benefit version
In 2020, Journey recorded a new version of the song to promote UNICEF's "Won't Stop" campaign, which was created to raise funds to buy personal protective equipment for medical frontline workers and provide for the needs of impoverished children. The performance aired on MSNBC and featured longtime members Arnel Pineda, Neal Schon, and Jonathan Cain, along with returning bass player Randy Jackson (who was previously Journey's session and touring bassist from 1986 to 1987), new keyboard player Jason Derlatka, and new drummer Narada Michael Walden.

See also
 List of best-selling singles
List of best-selling singles in the United States

References

1981 songs
1981 singles
Journey (band) songs
Pop ballads
Rock ballads
Grammy Hall of Fame Award recipients
Songs written by Steve Perry
Songs written by Jonathan Cain
Songs written by Neal Schon
2009 singles
2010 singles
Song recordings produced by Mike Stone (record producer)
Steel Panther songs
Columbia Records singles
Songs about Detroit
Detroit Red Wings
San Francisco Giants
1981 neologisms
United States National Recording Registry recordings